Mokhtar Ghyaza (born 15 November 1986) is a Tunisian basketball player who currently plays for US Monastir of the Championnat National A and the Basketball Africa League (BAL).

Professional career
Ghyaza has played pro club basketball with Ezzahra Sports and Club Africain in the Tunisian Basketball League.  

In the offseason of 2019, Ghyaza signed with US Monastir. After winning the 2020 championship, he made his debut in the Basketball Africa League (BAL) with the team. Monastir reached the finals. On 10 September 2021, he re-signed for another season. On 28 May 2022, he won the club's first-ever BAL championship with Monastir.

Tunisian national basketball team
Ghyaza was a member of the senior men's Tunisia national basketball team that finished third at the 2009 FIBA Africa Championship, to qualify for the country's first FIBA World Championship.  Ghyaza averaged 5.7 points and 1.3 rebounds per game, off the bench, for the Tunisians during the tournament.  He pulled down a team-leading five rebounds for the Tunisians in a bronze medal victory over Cameroon, that sent the team to the 2010 FIBA World Championship.

BAL career statistics

|-
|style="text-align:left;"|2021
|style="text-align:left;"|Monastir
| 6 || 0 || 14.0 || .444 || – || .818 || 2.8 || .7 || 2.0 || .7 || 4.2
|-
|style="text-align:left;background:#afe6ba;"|2022†
|style="text-align:left;"|Monastir
| 8 || 0 || 16.8 || .667 || – || .714 || 4.6 || .9 || 1.1 || .6 || 6.3

References

External links
 Afrobasket profile

1986 births
Living people
US Monastir basketball players
Basketball players at the 2012 Summer Olympics
Centers (basketball)
Ezzahra Sports players
Tunisian expatriate basketball people in Qatar
Tunisian men's basketball players
Olympic basketball players of Tunisia
People from Sfax
Club Africain basketball players
2010 FIBA World Championship players
2019 FIBA Basketball World Cup players